Roman Carts (Italian - Barrocci romani) is an 1872-73 tempera on canvas painting by Giovanni Fattori, painted during a stay in Rome. It is now in the Galleria d'Arte Moderna in Florence, Italy.

References

Paintings in the collection of the Gallery of Modern Art (Florence)
1873 paintings
Paintings by Giovanni Fattori